HTY may refer to:

 Hatay Airport, in Turkey.
 Hattersley railway station, in England
 Henty railway station, in New South Wales, Australia
 Hsin Tung Yang, a Taiwanese food service company and retailer